Madagascar National Parks, formerly known as the  (ANGAP), was founded in 1990 and is charged with managing a network of 46 National Parks, Special Reserves and Integral Nature Reserves in Madagascar. It is a private association that is legally recognised to have a public function since 4 December 1991, and it operates under the supervision of the ministry responsible for the environment, which, as of June 2008, is the Ministry of the Environment and Forests (MEF).

The association's mission is "To establish, conserve and sustainably manage a national network of parks and reserves representative of the biological diversity and the natural heritage of Madagascar."

See also

References

External links
Madagascar National Parks Official website (in French)
Supporting urgent biodiversity conservation in Madagascar World Bank website on Conservation Project in Madagascar (in English, French)

Nature conservation in Madagascar
Environmental organisations based in Madagascar